The Silent Sea is a 2021 South Korean streaming television series starring Bae Doona, Gong Yoo and Lee Joon. Director Choi Hang-yong created the series of eight episodes as an adaptation of his 2014 short film, The Sea of Tranquility, with the help of writer Park Eun-kyo. It premiered on Netflix on December 24, 2021. The title The Silent Sea comes from the Sea of Tranquility on the moon; the story follows a crewed mission to retrieve samples from a lunar research base. Mostly science fiction, it also blends genres like thriller and mystery. It received generally positive reviews from critics and audiences.

Summary
On a near-future Earth suffering from extreme desertification, draconian measures have been put in place for potable water rationing. Scientist Song JiAn (Bae Doona) joins a hand-picked team of elite personnel on a mission to the moon. They are headed to an abandoned research facility, Balhae Station, where her sister died five years prior, after 117 personnel were killed in an incident. The circumstances surrounding the incident are secret. Their mission is to retrieve a mysterious and sensitive sample. The captain of the team, Han YunJae (Gong Yoo), is a soldier for the space agency. Lieutenant Ryu Taeseok (Lee Joon) of the Ministry of National Defense volunteers to be part of the crew.

At the lunar facility, Song ascertains that the higher-ups have floated a bunch of half-truths and outright lies regarding the mission and the facility, and the nature of the accident that wiped out the staff. The sample turns out to consist of a new element that ostensibly looks like water, but multiplies like a virus when it comes in contact with living cells. The team is attacked by a violent superhuman girl on the space station, one who is immune to the effects of lunar water. Meanwhile, they must contend with the fact that some members of their own party may have ulterior motives that lead to betrayal.

Cast

Main
 Bae Doona as Doctor Song Ji-an
An astrobiologist determined to uncover the truth behind an accident at the now-abandoned Balhae Base research station on the moon, where her deceased sister was a researcher.
Gong Yoo as Han Yoon-jae
The exploration team leader who must carry out a crucial mission with limited information. He puts the completion of the mission and the safety of his team members above all else and does not refrain from putting himself in jeopardy to do so.
 Lee Joon as Lieutenant Ryu Tae-seok
 The head engineer and former elite member of the Ministry of National Defense who volunteered for the mission in an attempt to escape the stifling environment at the Ministry, but is also harboring a deeper secret.

Supporting
Members of the mission
 Kim Sun-young as Dr. Hong Ga-Young
The doctor of the team.
 Kim Si-a as Luna 073
A mysterious girl that is the sole survivor of the Balhae accident from 5 years prior.
 Lee Moo-saeng as Chief Gong Soo-hyuk
Head of the security team and elder brother of Soo-chan.
 Lee Sung-wook as Kim Sun
 The main shuttle pilot of the team.
 Choi Yong-Woo as Lee Gi-su
The shuttle co-pilot of the team who was switched with Eun Ji-young and joined the mission at the last minute.
 Jung Soon-Won as Gong Soo-chan
 The assistant engineer of the team and brother of Chief Gong.
 Yoo Hee-je as E2
 A soldier on the team.
 Cha Rae-Hyoung as E1
 A soldier on the team.
 Yoo Sung-joo as Mr. Hwang
 A previous employee at Balhae station that left prior to, and thus was not present for, the incident 5 years ago, and now serves as the team's consultant.
Yoon Hae-ri as Eun Ji-Young
The original co-pilot of the mission, but was later switched with Lee Gi-su at the last minute.

Space and Aeronautics Administration (SAA)
 Kang Mal-geum as Song Won-kyung.
The chief researcher in Balhae station and the elder sister of Song Ji-an. Deceased prior to the start of the series.
Heo Sung-tae as Kim Jae-sun.
Chief of Resource Group of Aviation Administration
 Gil Hae-yeon as Director Choi
 Ahn Dong-goo as Employee

Episodes

Production

Development
In December 2019, Netflix announced that it would produce the television series The Silent Sea, adapted from the 2014 eponymous short film directed by Choi Hang-yong. He will also be directing the series, with Jung Woo-sung standing in as the executive producer.

Casting
In April 2020, Bae Doona and Gong Yoo were cast in lead roles. In September 2020, they were officially joined by Heo Sung-tae and Lee Moo-saeng.

Reception 

 The site's critical consensus reads, "The Silent Sea marks one small step for man, one overlong leap for television, but it delivers enough intrigue and menace to satisfy patient viewers."

See also 

 Lunar base
 Manned mission to the Moon
 Water on the Moon

References

External links
 
 
 

Korean-language Netflix original programming
2021 South Korean television series debuts
Post-apocalyptic television series
South Korean mystery television series
South Korean thriller television series
South Korean science fiction television series
Fiction set on the Moon
Television series about the Moon